Glendale is a village in Hamilton County, Ohio, United States. The population was 2,298 at the 2020 census. It is a northern suburb of Cincinnati, and is the site of the Glendale Historic District.

Geography
Glendale is located at  (39.271258, -84.463957).

Demographics

2010 census
As of the census of 2010, there were 2,155 people, 969 households, and 628 families living in the village. The racial makeup of the village was 81.4% White, 15.4% African American, 1.5% Asian, 0.4% from other races, and 1.3% from two or more races. Hispanic or Latino of any race were 1.3% of the population.

There were 969 households, of which 23.9% had children under the age of 18 living with them, 55.0% were married couples living together, 7.3% had a female householder with no husband present, 2.5% had a male householder with no wife present, and 35.2% were non-families. 30.7% of all households were made up of individuals, and 11.3% had someone living alone who was 65 years of age or older. The average household size was 2.20 and the average family size was 2.75.

The median age in the village was 49.6 years. 19.6% of residents were under the age of 18; 3.5% were between the ages of 18 and 24; 18.8% were from 25 to 44; 38.1% were from 45 to 64; and 20.1% were 65 years of age or older. The gender makeup of the village was 48.4% male and 51.6% female.

Culture
Glendale's symbol is the black squirrel. Twenty-five statues of squirrels in varying attire have been placed by certain buildings in the style of downtown Cincinnati's Big Pig Gig.

Government
Glendale operates its own wastewater (sewage) treatment plant and water plant (artesian wells).

Education 
Glendale is served by Princeton City Schools, a consolidated school district also serving the communities of Evendale, Lincoln Heights, Sharonville,  Springdale and Woodlawn. Glendale public students attend Glendale Elementary, Princeton Middle School, and Princeton High School. Private schools in Glendale are Bethany School (a K-8 school associated with the Episcopal Church) and St. Gabriel (affiliated with the Roman Catholic Archdiocese of Cincinnati).

Notable people
 Anthony Harkness, founded the village about 1853.
 Peg Entwistle, actress famous for her suicide by jumping off the Hollywood Sign
 Megan McCormick, host of the series Globe Trekker
 Alfred B. Mullett, architect
 Bob Trumpy, former Cincinnati Bengals player, NBC and CBS broadcaster
 John Weld Peck II, Federal Judge, United States Court of Appeals for the Sixth Circuit
 Sparky Anderson, lived in Glendale while managing the Cincinnati Reds in the 1970s.
 William Cooper Procter, born and lived in Glendale.
 Charles W. Sawyer, United States Secretary of Commerce from 1948–1953.

References

External links
 Village website
 Community photographs
 Glendale Heritage Preservation & Museum
 Glendale's famous squirrels 
 Railroads of Cincinnati, includes information and photos of CSX / B&O through Glendale

Villages in Hamilton County, Ohio
Villages in Ohio
Municipalities of the Cincinnati metropolitan area